Duchesne High School may refer to:

 Duchesne Academy of the Sacred Heart (Nebraska)
 Duchesne High School (Missouri)
 Duchesne High School (Utah)